Josaphat Brunet (1902-1974) was a senior police officer in Canada.
In 1956 he was the founding director of the RCMP Security Service.
In 1958 he was promoted to Deputy Commissioner of the Royal Canadian Mounted Police.  Following his retirement from the RCMP he became, briefly, the director of Security for the National Bank of Canada.  Later in 1960 he was appointed Director General of the Sûreté du Québec, a post he held for five years.

Brunet's son, Gilles Brunet, followed his father into the RCMP Security Service, where, at first, he seemed destined for promotion.  But, in 1973, he was fired from the RCMP, due to ties to organized crime figures.

Josaphat Brunet died in 1974.

Western intelligence agencies would later learn that Josaphat's son Gilles had become a double agent for the Soviet Union and had been paid hundreds of thousands of dollars to betray Canada and its allies.  Another man, Leslie James Bennett, had been fired due to CIA suspicions that he was the mole within the RCMP.  Commentators on intelligence matters would point out that Josaphat's role as the founding director of Canada's spy-catching agency had eased his son Gilles's attempts to evade detection, because he was "one of us".

References

1902 births
1974 deaths
Royal Canadian Mounted Police officers